O.H. Allen was the mayor of San Jose, California from 1854 to 1855.

Mayors of San Jose, California
History of the San Francisco Bay Area
Year of birth missing
Year of death missing